Selma Feldbach (May 5, 1878 – April 2, 1924) was the first Estonian woman to become a medical doctor. In 1904 she graduated in medicine from the University of Bern.

References

20th-century Estonian physicians
Estonian women physicians
1878 births
1924 deaths
University of Bern alumni
Estonian expatriates in Switzerland
Physicians from the Russian Empire